The 2008 Camping World RV 400 presented by Coleman, was the twenty-ninth race of the 2008 NASCAR Sprint Cup season and also served as the third race in the 2008 Chase for the Sprint Cup.Jimmie Johnson of Hendrick Motorsports won the race.

Summary
The  race, not to be confused with the Camping World RV 400 at Dover, Delaware, was held on September 28 at the  Kansas Speedway in Kansas City, Kansas. ABC carried the race beginning at 1 pm US EDT and MRN along with Sirius Satellite Radio had radio coverage starting at 1:15 pm US EDT.

Pre-Race News
The big story came a week earlier, as the speedway, owned by International Speedway Corporation has won a coveted casino license.  Plans are to bring the Hard Rock Hotel and Casino, a rock-and-roll themed casino overlooking Turn Two to be built on the property, and also add a second race to a future NASCAR Sprint Cup season no later than 2011 by taking one of the dates from one of the ISC-owned tracks.
In a somewhat unexpected surprising move, A. J. Allmendinger is out of the Team Red Bull #84 Toyota after the season, and it is expected that Scott Speed will replace him.
NASCAR will honor the legacy of actor and former Sprint Cup Series co-owner Paul Newman this weekend with a moment of silence during the pre-race ceremonies. Newman co-owned what is now the #12 car in the 1990s before selling it to Roger Penske.

Qualifying
Juan Pablo Montoya claimed the pole position for the race; however, in post-race inspection, he was disqualified and placed 43rd because of illegal shock absorbers with a higher than usual gas pressure.  As a result, Jimmie Johnson, who finished second in the qualifying, was awarded the pole position.

OP: qualified via owners points

PC: qualified as past champion

PR: provisional

QR: via qualifying race

* - had to qualify on time

Failed to qualify: Michael McDowell (#00), Johnny Sauter (#08).

Race recap
The top three drivers the Chase finished 1-2-3 as Johnson beat Carl Edwards and Greg Biffle. This race was well known for its spectacular finish between Jimmie Johnson and Carl Edwards, where Edwards charged into the inside of Johnson in turn 3. The turn was too wide, causing Edwards' car to not turn completely at full speed, and hit the wall, where Johnson passed him. Johnson ducked to the apron and Edwards followed, but Johnson beat him by two car lengths.

Results

References

Camping World RV 400 presented by Coleman
Camping World RV 400 presented by Coleman
NASCAR races at Kansas Speedway